Richard E. Sherzan (born December 22, 1946) is an American politician living in the State of Iowa.  He is a lifelong Democrat.
Sherzan was born in Mobile, Alabama, to Gloria and Edward Sherzan. He grew up in Des Moines, Iowa.  He moved to Arizona in 1983, and then returned to live in Iowa, in 2021.  He has an M.A., Master's degree, in American History, University of Iowa, and a J.D. degree from Drake University Law School, in Des Moines. In 1976, he was Polk County, Iowa, Coordinator for the Morris K. Udall Presidential Campaign.  He served in the Iowa State Legislature, House of Representatives, from 1979 to 1981, after a year long, door-to-door campaign.

While living in Arizona, he worked as a law clerk with the Maricopa County Attorney's Office (Civil Division); Arizona Attorney General's Office (Criminal Division); and private law firms (self-employed).  He has a Community College Teacher Certification (Law, History) from Arizona; and has been a part-time Community College Teacher, and Substitute Teacher, K-12.  In 2014, after working 17 years, he retired, as an Administrative Law Judge, from the Arizona Dept. of Economic Security, Unemployment Insurance Office of Appeals.  He is a U.S. Army, Vietnam War Veteran, with Honorable Discharge; Purple Heart Award; and Bronze Star Award with "V" Device (heroism in ground combat, Vietnam). He also protested the Vietnam War.

In Arizona, Sherzan was a candidate for the U.S. Senate, in the Arizona Democratic Party primary elections, during the general elections of 2016 and 2018.

References

1946 births
Living people
Politicians from Mobile, Alabama
Democratic Party members of the Iowa House of Representatives
Arizona Democrats
United States Army personnel of the Vietnam War
American anti–Vietnam War activists
Candidates in the 2018 United States Senate elections
Drake University Law School alumni